Jackson is a city in Clarke County, Alabama, United States. The population was 5,557 at the 2020 census. It was one of three wet settlements in an otherwise-dry county.

Geography
Jackson is located along the western border of Clarke County at coordinates , on a rise overlooking east bank of the Tombigbee River.

Jackson sits across the Tombigbee River from Washington County, Alabama.

Climate

Demographics

2020

As of the 2020 United States Census, there were 4,748 people, 1,775 households, and 1,112 families residing in the city.

2010
At the 2010 census there were 5,228 people, 2,112 households, and 1,446 families living in the city. The racial makeup of the city was 54.9% White, 42.9% African American, 0.7% Native American, 0.4% Asian, 0.3% from other races, and 0.8% from two or more races. Hispanic or Latino of any race were 1.4%.

Of the 2,112 households 28.4% had children under the age of 18 living with them, 46.6% were married couples living together, 17.9% had a female householder with no husband present, and 31.5% were non-families. 29.4% of households were one person and 10.8% were one person aged 65 or older. The average household size was 2.44 and the average family size was 3.00.

The age distribution was 25.1% under the age of 18, 6.9% from 18 to 24, 23.6% from 25 to 44, 26.8% from 45 to 64, and 17.5% 65 or older. The median age was 40.4 years. For every 100 females, there were 87.7 males. For every 100 females age 18 and over, there were 88.9 males.

The median household income was $32,917 and the median family income  was $46,328. Males had a median income of $54,688 versus $29,483 for females. The per capita income for the city was $21,822. About 21.9% of families and 29.0% of the population were below the poverty line, including 37.4% of those under age 18 and 18.3% of those age 65 or over.

2000
At the 2000 census there were 5,419 people, 2,094 households, and 1,507 families living in the city. The racial makeup of the city was 60.42% White, 38.49% African American, 0.26% Native American, 0.37% Asian, 0.20% from other races, and 0.26% from two or more races. Hispanic or Latino of any race were 0.65%.

Of the 2,094 households 34.0% had children under the age of 18 living with them, 53.5% were married couples living together, 15.8% had a female householder with no husband present, and 28.0% were non-families. 26.3% of households were one person and 12.2% were one person aged 65 or older. The average household size was 2.54 and the average family size was 3.08.

The age distribution was 26.6% under the age of 18, 8.1% from 18 to 24, 27.2% from 25 to 44, 22.5% from 45 to 64, and 15.5% 65 or older. The median age was 38 years. For every 100 females, there were 85.8 males. For every 100 females age 18 and over, there were 80.4 males.

The median household income was $34,806 and the median family income  was $45,516. Males had a median income of $43,558 versus $21,125 for females. The per capita income for the city was $17,346. About 15.3% of families and 21.2% of the population were below the poverty line, including 27.9% of those under age 18 and 20.1% of those age 65 or over.

History

Jackson was founded in 1816 and is named after President Andrew Jackson. Former names for the city include Pine Level and Republicville.

During the Civil War, a Confederate fort was established on the banks of the Tombigbee River. It was named Fort Carney and was positioned on Carney's Bluff just south of Jackson. The cannon that was on the bluff now sits in front of City Hall.

Jackson has four sites listed on the National Register of Historic Places. They are the Jackson Historic District, Clarke Mills, Doit W. McClellan Lustron House, and J. P. McKee Lustron House.

During World War II, a prisoner-of-war camp was built and operated holding 253 captured German soldiers on Ocre Avenue.  The camp was opened April 6, 1945 and closed March 12, 1946.  Many of the prisoners were members of the Afrika Korps.

Economy
The economy of Jackson is driven by the timber industry. Packaging Corporation of America has a paper mill that is the largest employer located in the city.

Education
Coastal Alabama Community College
Jackson Academy
Jackson Middle School
Jackson High School
Jackson Intermediate
Joe M. Gillmore Elementary
Walker Springs Baptist Church

Notable people
 Ann Bedsole (born 1930), member of both houses of the Alabama State Legislature 1979-1995
 Stew Bolen (1902–1969), former Major League Baseball player
 Antonio Chatman (born 1979), NFL wide receiver
 Jimmy Outlaw (1913–2006), former Major League Baseball player
 Ray Prim (1906–1995), former Major League Baseball pitcher, raised in Jackson
 John "Jabo" Starks (1938–2018), funk and blues drummer
 Travis and Bob, musical duo
 Samaje Perine (born 1995), NFL Running-Back

References

External links
 City of Jackson official website
 Jackson Area Chamber of Commerce
 The South Alabamian, local newspaper covering Jackson and surrounding area
 Coastal Gateway Regional Economic Development Alliance

Cities in Alabama
Cities in Clarke County, Alabama
Populated places established in 1816
1816 establishments in Mississippi Territory